Ice hockey at the 2017 Asian Winter Games was held in Sapporo, Japan between 18–26 February at three venues (Tsukisamu Gymnasium, Mikaho Gymnasium and the Hoshioki Skating Rink).

A total of 18 men's teams competed in three divisions (four in Top Division, six in Division I and eight in Division II), along with six women's teams. Originally 20 men's teams were scheduled to compete, however Bahrain withdrew. Iran was also scheduled to compete, however after arriving, more than half the team was deemed ineligible to represent the country due to eligibility issues. Thus the team was disqualified. However the country still played its matches as friendlies, but they did not count towards the standings.

Schedule

Medalists

Medal table

Draw
The top division was consisted of four teams.

The next six teams registered for the first division based on IIHF World Ranking and 2016 IIHF Challenge Cup of Asia.

The remaining teams participated at the second division.

Group A

*
 Independent Olympic Athletes

Group B

*

* Bahrain withdrew, Iran did not participate in the tournament due to lack of eligible players.

Final standing

Men

Women

References

External links
Official Results Book – Ice Hockey

 
Asian Winter Games
2017 Asian Winter Games events
2017
2017
Asian